Salvador Sánchez Salinas (born 31 July 1995) is an Argentine professional footballer who plays as a centre back for Chilean Primera División club Coquimbo Unido.

Career
Sánchez's youth career began with Tres Algarrobos in 2008, he remained there for two years before joining River Plate's youth ranks. Five years later, he left to join Argentine Primera División club Arsenal de Sarandí. His first mark on Arsenal's first-team came during the 2015 Copa Sudamericana when he was on the bench twice for a tie against Independiente. He made his professional football debut on 20 September 2015 in a league win against Olimpo, he made a further two appearances in the 2015 campaign. Sanchez joined Primera B Nacional side Santamarina in September 2017 following a trial period during pre-season.

His Santamarina debut came on 16 September versus Aldosivi. Eighteen further appearances followed, prior to a move to fellow Primera B Nacional outfit Olimpo on 4 July 2018.

In 2023, he joined Coquimbo Unido in the Chilean Primera División.

Career statistics
.

References

External links

1995 births
Living people
Sportspeople from Buenos Aires Province
Argentine footballers
Argentine expatriate footballers
Association football defenders
Torneo Argentino C players
Argentine Primera División players
Primera Nacional players
Club Atlético River Plate footballers
Arsenal de Sarandí footballers
Club y Biblioteca Ramón Santamarina footballers
Olimpo footballers
Chacarita Juniors footballers
Super League Greece players
Volos N.F.C. players
A Lyga players
FK Panevėžys players
Chilean Primera División players
Coquimbo Unido footballers
Expatriate footballers in Greece
Expatriate footballers in Lithuania
Expatriate footballers in Chile
Argentine expatriate sportspeople in Greece
Argentine expatriate sportspeople in Lithuania
Argentine expatriate sportspeople in Chile